Daoud Aoulad-Syad (Arabic: داوود اولاد السيد ; born April 14, 1953 in Marrakech) is a Moroccan photographer, director, and screenwriter. His photography, mostly revolving around Morocco and its inhabitants, has been featured in exhibitions worldwide.

Biography 
While studying for a doctorate in physics at the University of Nancy, he became passionate about photography. After several exhibitions, he started attending a film workshop at the École nationale supérieure des métiers de l'image et du son. He directed the short films Mémoire ocre, Entre l'absence et l'oubli and L'Oued before making his first feature film, Adieu forain in 1998.

Filmography

Director 
 1991 : Mémoire ocre (short film)
 1993 : Entre l'absence et l'oubli (short film)
 1995 : L’Oued (short film)
 1998 : Adieu forain
 2001 : Le Cheval de vent (Aoud rih)
 2004 : Tarfaya
 2007 : Waiting for Pasolini (Fi intidar Pasolini)
 2010 : La Mosquée (A Jamaâ)
 2018 : Les voix du désert

References

External links 
 

1953 births
Living people
Moroccan photographers
People from Marrakesh